Carlantino is a village and comune in the province of Foggia in the Apulia region of southeast Italy.

References

Cities and towns in Apulia